Mathopen is a suburban village in the borough of Laksevåg in the municipality of Bergen in Vestland county, Norway.

References

Villages in Vestland
Neighbourhoods of Bergen